Swan Township is an active township in Taney County, in the U.S. state of Missouri.

Swan Township was founded in 1839, taking its name from Swan Creek.

References

Townships in Missouri
Townships in Taney County, Missouri